Tary may refer to:

People
 Gizella Tary (1884–1960), Hungarian fencer
 Tibor Tary (1909–1945), Hungarian sports shooter

Places
 Tary, Volgograd Oblast, Russia
 Ust-Tary, Perm Krai, Russia

See also
 Tari (disambiguation)